William Mead may refer to

 William Mead (merchant) (1628–1713), prominent London Quaker
 William H. Mead (1921–1974), bishop of the Episcopal Diocese of Delaware
 William Perrett Mead (1889–1980), New Zealand and writer
 William Richard Mead (1915–2014), British geographer
 William Rutherford Mead (1846–1928), American architect

See also
Billy Mead (born 1999), English cricketer